The Full Monty is a 1997 British comedy film directed by Peter Cattaneo, starring Robert Carlyle, Mark Addy, William Snape, Steve Huison, Tom Wilkinson, Paul Barber and Hugo Speer. The screenplay was written by Simon Beaufoy. The film is set in Sheffield in the North of England during the 1990s, and tells the story of six unemployed men, four of them former steel workers, who decide to form a male striptease act (à la Chippendale dancers) in order to make some money and for the main character, Gaz, to be able to see his son. Gaz declares that their show will be much better than the renowned Chippendales dancers because they will go "the full monty"—strip all the way—hence the film's title.

Despite being a comedy, the film also touches on serious subjects such as unemployment, fathers' rights, depression, impotence, homosexuality, body image, working class culture and suicide. The Full Monty was a major critical success upon release and an international commercial success, grossing over $250 million from a budget of only $3.5 million. It was the highest-grossing film in the UK until it was outsold by Titanic. It won the BAFTA Award and European Film Award for Best Film, and was nominated for Academy Awards for Best Picture, Best Director, Best Original Screenplay and Best Original Musical or Comedy Score, winning the last.

The British Film Institute ranked The Full Monty the 25th best British film of the 20th century. The film was adapted into a musical in 2000, a play in 2013 and a planned television series.

Plot
In the mid-1990s, the once-successful steel mills of Sheffield, South Yorkshire have shut down and most of the staff have been made redundant. Former steelworkers Gary "Gaz" Schofield and Dave Horsefall have resorted to stealing scrap metal from the abandoned mills to sell in order to make some cash, taking Gaz's son Nathan with them for assistance, but a security guard keeps surprising them and locking them inside the steel mill.

Gaz is facing trouble from his former wife Mandy and her boyfriend Barry over child support payments that he has been unable to pay since losing his job. Nathan lives with Mandy and Barry but Gaz has joint custody of him with Mandy. Nathan wishes he and his father Gaz could do more "normal stuff" together. Mandy is seeking a court ruling giving her sole custody of Nathan, whom Gaz loves dearly. Gaz is desperate for money and for Nathan’s love.

One day, Gaz spots a crowd of women lined up outside a local club to see a Chippendales' striptease act, and is inspired to form his own striptease group using local men, hoping to make enough money to pay off his child support obligations. The first to join the group is Lomper, a security guard at the steel mill where Dave and Gaz once worked, whose suicide attempt they interrupt. Next, they recruit Gerald Cooper, their former foreman, who is hiding his unemployment from his wife. Gaz and Dave see Gerald and his wife, Linda, at a dance class, and recruit him to teach them some actual dance moves.

Looking for more recruits, the four men hold an open audition and settle on Horse, an older man who is nevertheless a good dancer, and Guy, who can't dance at all but proves to be unusually well-endowed. The six men begin to practise their act. Gaz then learns that he has to pay a £100 deposit in order to secure the club for the night. He cannot afford this, but Nathan gets the money out of his savings, saying he trusts Gaz to repay him. When they are greeted by two local women while putting up posters for the show, Gaz boasts that they are better than the real Chippendales because they go "the full monty". Dave, struggling with his body image, drops out and finds a job as a security guard at Asda. The others publicly rehearse at the mill for some female relatives of Horse, but a passing policeman catches them mid-show, and Gaz, Gerald and Horse are arrested for indecent exposure, costing Gaz the right to see Nathan. Lomper and Guy manage to escape to Lomper's house, where they look lovingly at each other, starting a relationship.

Gerald is thrown out by Linda after bailiffs arrive at their house and seize their belongings to pay Gerald's debts, resulting in him having to stay with Gaz. Later Gaz goes to Asda and asks Dave if he could "borrow" a jacket for Lomper's mother's funeral. Dave agrees and also decides to quit his security job. They steal two suit jackets and go to the funeral together.

Soon, the group find the act and their arrest has popularised them. They agree to forgo the plan, until Gaz learns that the show is sold out. He convinces the others to do it just for one night only. Gerald is unsure as he has now got the job that Gaz and Dave earlier tried to sabotage his interview for, but agrees to do it just once. Initially Dave still refuses, but regains his confidence after encouragement from his wife, Jean, and joins the rest of the group minutes before they go on stage. Nathan also arrives with Dave, having secretly come along, and tells Gaz that Mandy is there, but she would not let Barry go with her.

Gaz refuses to do the act because there are men in the audience (including the police officers who watched the footage of the security camera's recording of them earlier), when the posters were supposed to say it was for women only. The other five are starting the act when Nathan orders his father to go out on stage. Gaz, proud of his son, joins the others and performs in front of the audience and Mandy, who seems to see him in a new light. The film finishes with the group performing on stage in front of an enthusiastic packed house, stripping to Tom Jones' version of "You Can Leave Your Hat On" (their hats being the final item removed) with astounding success.

Cast

 Robert Carlyle as Gary "Gaz" Schofield
 Mark Addy as Dave Horsefall
 Tom Wilkinson as Gerald Arthur Cooper
 Steve Huison as Lomper
 Paul Barber as Barrington "Horse" Mitchell
 Hugo Speer as Guy
 William Snape as Nathan Schofield
 Lesley Sharp as Jean Horsefall
 Emily Woof as Mandy
 Deirdre Costello as Linda Cooper
 Paul Butterworth as Barry
 Dave Hill as Alan
 Bruce Jones as Reg
 Andrew Livingston as Terry
 Vinny Dhillon as Sharon
 Kate Rutter as Dole Clerk

Production
Channel 4 Films paid for the screenplay to be written but then declined to invest any equity in the film. Fox Searchlight ended up financing it for almost £3 million.

The famous "Hot Stuff" scene, in which the characters dance in the queue at the Jobcentre, was originally going to be cut from the final production as it was considered "too unrealistic".

The cast allegedly agreed that all six of them would really do the "full monty" strip at the end in front of 50 extras, provided they had to do only one take. Hugo Speer told the Guardian in 2019: "The climactic scene was nuts. It was in a very cold working men’s club, starting at about midday. The makeup and costume girls knew how we were feeling, so they were thrusting glasses of alcohol into our hands between takes. The extras had smuggled in booze, too. They weren’t aware we were going to go all the way – that was a bit of smarts on the producers’ part, so it was a completely natural reaction they got at the end."

The production and shooting was also said to be very challenging, with Robert Carlyle saying: "The Full Monty was a tough shoot, it really really was. Horrible."

Locations
The film was shot entirely on location in and around Sheffield in April 1996, except for a couple of locations in Shirebrook, Derbyshire.

The Reel Monty
The opening sequence of the Sheffield promotion film from 1972 is taken from City on the Move, a film commissioned by Peter Wigley, Sheffield's first ever publicity officer, to convince people that Sheffield was a centre for tourism and commerce. City on the Move was produced and directed by Jim and Marie-Luise Coulthard and showed a modern thriving city that was rapidly developing thanks to the successful steel industry in Sheffield. However, the film went virtually unnoticed until the Coulthards were approached about some of the footage being included in The Full Monty for a payment of £400, which they accepted. In 2008, City on the Move was released on DVD under the new name The Reel Monty.

Language

The film features frequent use of British slang, and in particular Sheffielder dialect.

The film's title is a phrase generally used in the United Kingdom to mean "the whole lot", or "the whole hog"; in the film, the characters use it to refer to full nudity — as Horse says, "No one said anything to me about the full monty!" The phrase, whose origin is obscure, gained a renewed prominence in British culture following the film.

Other dialect words are used in the film; some such as nesh (meaning a person unusually susceptible to cold) are widespread across the North Midlands region. Jennel (an alley) is local to Sheffield: it is a variation on the word "ginnel", which is in full versions of the Oxford English Dictionary and is used in many parts of England.

Release

Critical reception
The film surprised critics when it was first released, earning near-universal acclaim, and it went on to be nominated for the Academy Award for Best Picture.

Writing in Time Out New York regarding the implications of the film Andrew Johnston stated: "Monty is much less ribald than it sounds. The funniest moments are frequently the most subtle, like when five of the strippers, standing in the dole line, find themselves unable to resist dancing in place when Donna Summers's "Hot Stuff" comes on the radio. There's surprisingly little raunch, in part because the film can't stop thinking of women as enemies of a sort (at least Monty is less offensive than Brassed Off in that department). And refreshingly, its definition of male bonding is broad enough to let two of the lads find love in each other's arms."

Review aggregate Rotten Tomatoes retrospectively reports that 96% of critics have given the film a positive review based on 50 reviews, with an average score of 7.50/10. The consensus reads, "Cheeky and infectiously good-natured, The Full Monty bares its big beating heart with a sly dose of ribald comedy." On Metacritic, which assesses films with a score out of 100, the film has a score of 75 based on 31 critics' reviews, indicating "generally favorable reviews".

Box office
When the film was released in the United Kingdom, it topped the box office for thirteen weeks, becoming the highest-grossing British film of all-time after nine weeks, surpassing Four Weddings and a Funeral. It also opened at number one in Australia where it remained for five weeks. In France, it opened at the same time as The Lost World: Jurassic Park and recorded a per screen average of $16,699 compared to the former's $19,133, finishing in third place for the week. On 27 January 1997 it surpassed Jurassic Park to become the highest-grossing film in the UK.

Accolades and recognition
The Full Monty won the BAFTA Award for Best Film in 1997, beating presumed frontrunners Titanic and L.A. Confidential and Carlyle won the BAFTA Award for Best Actor in a Leading Role. It was nominated for a total of four Academy Awards: Best Picture, Best Director, Best Original Score and Best Original Screenplay.

In 1997, the Academy Award for Best Original Score was split up into two categories: Dramatic and Musical or Comedy. In light of 1997's big winner, Titanic, the film won only the Oscar for Best Original Musical or Comedy Score by Anne Dudley, with the Best Picture and Best Director Oscars going to Titanic and its director James Cameron and the Best Original Screenplay Oscar going to Ben Affleck and Matt Damon for Good Will Hunting. The film was also nominated for the prestigious Grand Prix of the Belgian Syndicate of Cinema Critics.

In 1999, it was ranked #25 on the BFI Top 100 British films list. In 2000, readers of Total Film magazine voted The Full Monty the 49th greatest comedy film of all time. By that year it earned an estimated £194 million at the box office worldwide.

Controversy
New Zealand playwrights Anthony McCarten and Stephen Sinclair filed a £180 million lawsuit against the producers of The Full Monty in 1998. They claim that the film blatantly infringed on their play, Ladies Night, which toured both Britain and New Zealand. Anthony McCarten and Stephen Sinclair created a website containing their play in response to statements from the producers of The Full Monty that claimed the two productions were not alike. The underlying rights were attributed to co-producer, Paul Bucknor, and the lawsuit was settled out of court; as part of the agreement, the website containing Ladies Night was shut down.

Soundtrack
Anne Dudley's Oscar for Best Score was a surprise, and some critics felt undeserved, inasmuch as the award is for original music and most of the film's memorable moments had jukebox favourites playing. Dudley composed "about 20 minutes' worth of music" for the film. Bob Strauss called the Oscar "well-deserved", while Pauline Reay felt Dudley's underscore complemented the familiar hits. Dudley described her score to Steven Poole:
It was this conglomeration of sounds—baritone sax, acoustic guitar, harmonica [...] The reasoning was that all these six men are different, they come from different backgrounds, but in the final scene it all works. The idea was that the instruments should do that as well—they all come from different places but they actually gel...

The album The Full Monty: Music from the Motion Picture Soundtrack includes two original tracks by Dudley plus the pop hits, including a cover by Tom Jones of "You Can Leave Your Hat On" commissioned and produced by Dudley, who had collaborated with Jones on a 1988 cover of "Kiss".

 "The Zodiac" – David Lindup (3:06)
 "You Sexy Thing" – Hot Chocolate (4:03)
 "You Can Leave Your Hat On" – Tom Jones (4:26)
 "Moving on Up" – M People (5:29)
 "Make Me Smile (Come Up and See Me)" – Steve Harley & Cockney Rebel (3:59)
 "The Full Monty" – Anne Dudley (3:04)
 "The Lunchbox Has Landed" – Anne Dudley (2:14)
 "Land of a Thousand Dances" – Wilson Pickett (2:24)
 "Rock & Roll, Pt. 2" – Gary Glitter (3:02)
 "Hot Stuff" – Donna Summer (3:49)
 "We Are Family" – Sister Sledge (3:35)
 "Flashdance... What a Feeling" – Irene Cara (3:49)
 "The Stripper" – Joe Loss & His Orchestra (2:11)

Certifications

Adaptations

In 1998 the film was novelized by the British writer Wendy Holden.

The film was adapted into a 2000 Broadway musical of the same name; the characters and setting were Americanized. The musical ran in the West End at the Prince of Wales Theatre in 2002.

It was also adapted into a stage play by the original screenwriter Simon Beaufoy, which opened at the Lyceum Theatre, Sheffield on 2 February 2013, directed by Sheffield Theatres artistic director Daniel Evans, before embarking on a national tour. It opened in the West End at the Noël Coward Theatre on 25 February 2014.

However, despite positive reviews, the show closed on 29 March, rather than the planned 14 June, after a run of just over a month. A Portuguese-language version was adapted for theatrical performance in Brazil by Brazilian journalist Artur Xexéo. This version of the play was directed by Tadeu Aguiar, and debuted in Brazil on 6 October 2015.

In 2017, twenty years after the film's release, an ITV Special titled The Real Full Monty was announced in order to raise awareness of prostate cancer and testicular cancer. It aired on 15 June 2017 and starred Alexander Armstrong, Ashley Banjo, Danny John-Jules, Dominic Littlewood, Elliott Wright, Harry Judd, Mark Foster, Matthew Wolfenden and Wayne Sleep. The show has returned each year since: The Real Full Monty and The Real Full Monty: Ladies' Night (2018), The All New Monty: Who Bares Wins (2019), The Real Full Monty on Ice (2020), Strictly The Real Full Monty (2021). Banjo has starred in every episode. A version of The Real Full Monty has been produced for Australian audiences, with the participants being Australian celebrities.

Television series 
In March 2021, it was announced that FX on Hulu and Disney+ will be adapting the film into a limited television series. The series is produced by Searchlight Television, FXP and Little Island Productions, with Simon Beaufoy creating, writing and executive producing the series. The original cast members, including Carlyle, Wilkinson and Addy were said to be reprising their roles. On 2 July 2022, Speer was removed from the series due to inappropriate conduct claims.

See also
 BFI Top 100 British films
 Brassed Off (1996)
 Billy Elliot (2000)
 Pride (2014 film)

References

External links

 The Full Monty at the British Film Institute
 
 
 
 

1990s British films
1990s English-language films
1990s buddy comedy films
1997 comedy films
1997 directorial debut films
1997 films
1997 independent films
BAFTA winners (films)
Best Film BAFTA Award winners
British buddy comedy films
British comedy films
British independent films
European Film Awards winners (films)
Films about striptease
Films adapted into plays
Films adapted into television shows
Films directed by Peter Cattaneo
Films scored by Anne Dudley
Films set in the 1970s
Films set in the 1980s
Films set in Sheffield
Films set in Yorkshire
Films shot in England
Films shot in Sheffield
Films shot in South Yorkshire
Films shot in Yorkshire
Films that won the Best Original Score Academy Award
Films with screenplays by Simon Beaufoy
Fox Searchlight Pictures films
Male erotic dance
Searchlight Pictures franchises